Lyady is the name of several rural localities in Russia.

Modern localities
Lyady, Karachevsky District, Bryansk Oblast, a village in Pesochensky Rural Administrative Okrug of Karachevsky District in Bryansk Oblast; 
Lyady, Klintsovsky District, Bryansk Oblast, a settlement in Smotrovobudsky Rural Administrative Okrug of Klintsovsky District in Bryansk Oblast; 
Lyady, Gartsevsky Rural Administrative Okrug, Starodubsky District, Bryansk Oblast, a settlement in Gartsevsky Rural Administrative Okrug of Starodubsky District in Bryansk Oblast; 
Lyady, Kaluga Oblast, a village in Mosalsky District of Kaluga Oblast
Lyady, Leningrad Oblast, a village in Rozhdestvenskoye Settlement Municipal Formation of Gatchinsky District in Leningrad Oblast; 
Lyady, Krasnobakovsky District, Nizhny Novgorod Oblast, a village in Zubilikhinsky Selsoviet of Krasnobakovsky District in Nizhny Novgorod Oblast
Lyady, Varnavinsky District, Nizhny Novgorod Oblast, a village in Bogorodsky Selsoviet of Varnavinsky District in Nizhny Novgorod Oblast
Lyady, Perm Krai, a selo in Permsky District of Perm Krai
Lyady, Pskov Oblast, a selo in Plyussky District of Pskov Oblast
Lyady, Smolensk Oblast, a village in Glinkovskoye Rural Settlement of Glinkovsky District in Smolensk Oblast
Lyady, Bezhetsky District, Tver Oblast, a village in Fralevskoye Rural Settlement of Bezhetsky District in Tver Oblast
Lyady, Penovsky District, Tver Oblast, a village in Chaykinskoye Rural Settlement of Penovsky District in Tver Oblast

Abolished localities
Lyady, Aleynikovsky Selsoviet, Starodubsky District, Bryansk Oblast, a settlement in Aleynikovsky Selsoviet of Starodubsky District in Bryansk Oblast; abolished in May 2010

Alternative names
Lyady, alternative name of Krasnye Lyady, a settlement in Novoropsky Rural Administrative Okrug of Klimovsky District in Bryansk Oblast;